Ulysses Simpson Grant "Stoney" McGlynn (May 26, 1872 in Lancaster, Pennsylvania – August 26, 1941 in Manitowoc, Wisconsin), was a professional baseball player who played pitcher in the Major Leagues from 1906 to 1908. He played for the St. Louis Cardinals.

External links

HH Bregstone postcard at vintageball.com

1872 births
1941 deaths
St. Louis Cardinals players
Major League Baseball pitchers
Baseball players from Pennsylvania
Harrisburg (minor league baseball) players
York Penn Parks players
Steubenville Stubs players
Milwaukee Brewers (minor league) players
Salt Lake City Skyscrapers players
Las Cruces Farmers players
El Paso Mackmen players